Pokerface is a 1986 mini series about a former journalist who works as an undercover agent for Australia's secret service.

References

External links
Pokerface at IMDb

1980s Australian television miniseries
1986 Australian television series debuts
1986 Australian television series endings
1986 television films
1986 films